The Michael Weir Foundation for the Arts is an organization that supports excellence in the arts, in memory of artist Michael Weir. The Michael Weir Foundation for the Arts sponsors awards that honour artistic excellence, including an annual award at the Atlantic Film Festival.

Michael Weir was raised in Swarthmore, Pennsylvania and lived in Halifax, Nova Scotia. He was an artist, writer, performer, and editor. He was an accomplished film editor, having been twice honored by the Atlantic Film Festival and nominated for the Academy of Canadian Cinema and Television's Genie Award.

Atlantic Film Festival Michael Weir Award for Outstanding Atlantic Screenplay

References

Foundations based in Canada
Arts organizations based in Canada